Grandma's Marathon is an annual road race held each June in Duluth, Minnesota, in the United States. The course runs point-to-point from the city of Two Harbors on Scenic Route 61 and continues along Lake Superior into the city of Duluth.  The finish is located in Canal Park, near Grandma's Restaurant, which is next to the highly visible Aerial Lift Bridge.

Race history

Grandma's was first run in 1977 with only 150 participants; the first race was won by Minnesotan and 1976 Olympic 10000m runner Garry Bjorklund. The newly opened Grandma's Restaurant was the only local business that would sponsor the then-fledgling event, for the fee of $600.  Race organizers then named the new race after the restaurant.  Grandma's Marathon is now run by almost 10,000 runners every year, has nearly a $2 million operating budget and is credited with bringing tens of millions of tourist dollars into the city of Duluth.

The men's record time for Grandma's is 2:09:06, set in 2014 by Dominic Ondoro of Kenya.  The previous record of 2:09:37, set in 1981 by Wayzata, Minnesota, native Dick Beardsley stood for 33 years before being broken. The women's record time is 2:24:28, set in 2018 by Kellyn Taylor. In 2005, Halina Karnatsevich was the first finisher with a time of 2:33:39 but she was later disqualified for failing her post-race doping test.

The race is a major event on the North Shore, filling hotels in many cities around Duluth. Thousands of runners and visitors fill the marathon, half and 5K races. After high numbers in the '90s and '00s, 2009 was the first time in 15 years that all of the 9,500 available spots were not filled, leading to a deficit in the race budget. Executive director Scott Keenan suggested that the economy was the main reason for the downturn in participants.  Lifetime entries were offered in 1987 (for $100) and again in 1990 (for $125) to help increase the number of runners entering the race.

The 35th edition of the marathon in 2011 had its first photo-finish: eventual winner Christopher Kipyego mistook the electronic timing mat for the finish point and prematurely stopped, leading to an impromptu sprint finish against Teklu Deneke. Just two tenths of a second ended up separating the pair.

The 37th running of the race in 2013 saw the first time that more people registered for the Bjorklund Half Marathon than Grandma's Marathon.  There were 7,835 registered for the Bjorklund Half Marathon but only 7,338 people registered for Grandma's Marathon.

The 40th annual race in 2016 set a record for the largest number of finishers at 7,522.  2016 also saw a record number of female finishers at 3,742, just short of the men's total at 3,780.

The race was run every year for 44 years until the COVID-19 pandemic. Race officials monitored the spread of COVID-19 in the state, and as the count of infected grew in St. Louis County, concerns mounted. On March 25, Minnesota Gov. Tim Walz announced a "stay at home" executive order for all citizens of the state.  Three days into the "stay at home" order, Grandma's Marathon officials announced that, for the first time, the marathon, the Garry Bjorklund Half Marathon and the William A. Irvin 5K would be canceled. No refunds or deferments were granted, but officials offered those who had already signed up a 40 percent discount on the 2021 or 2022 race.

Race Weekend

What started in 1977 as a single race has grown to a weekend of running events hosted by the Grandma's Marathon organization.

Thursday starts the health expo at the Duluth Entertainment Convention Center. Races begin Friday, kicked off with Whipper Snapper races for kids at Bayfront Festival Park, followed by the William A. Irvin 5K, which was first run in 1994. The race is named after the Great Lakes ore boat docked in the slip at the canal; the course starts at the stern, circles the canal area and finishes at the bow. Nearly 2,000 runners participate.

Early Saturday morning, the Garry Bjorklund Half Marathon, kicks off, sending more than 7,000 runners south on Scenic Route 61 to Duluth. The half marathon was first run in 1991 and has since eclipsed the marathon in participation by a few hundred runners. The race starts near the Talmadge River.

The full marathon begins an hour after the half marathon starts.

Throughout the rest of the year, the Grandma's Marathon organization runs other races, such as the Fitger's 5k, the Park Point 5 Miler, and the Grandma's Minnesota Mile.

Past winners
Key: 

After canceling the race, organizers planned to do a "virtual race."

Past winners of the Garry Bjorklund Half Marathon
2022—Men: Daniel Kemoi (KEN), 35, 1:02:03
2022—Women: Rosie Edwards (UK), 33, 1:12:45
...

See also
Twin Cities Marathon
Minneapolis Marathon
Mankato Marathon
Med City Marathon

References

Jack Moran & Malcolm Heyworth (2010-06-20). Grandma's Marathon. Association of Road Racing Statisticians. Retrieved on 2011-06-19.

External links
 Official site
 Marathon Info profile

Recurring sporting events established in 1977
Marathons in the United States
Foot races in Minnesota
Marathons in Minnesota
Minnesota culture
Sports in Duluth, Minnesota
Tourist attractions in Lake County, Minnesota
Tourist attractions in St. Louis County, Minnesota